José Alberto Escalante Rápalo (born 29 May 1995) is a Honduran footballer who plays as a midfielder for Canadian club Cavalry FC.

Club career

Olimpia
Escalante began his career with Olimpia, spending time on loan with Honduran side Honduras Progreso in 2014 and American United Soccer League side Rio Grande Valley FC Toros in 2016.
On 3 August 2016, Escalante joined Houston Dynamo on loan from Rio Grande Valley until the end of the 2016 season, returning to the Dynamo on 20 January 2017 on a 12-month loan deal from Olympia.

Juticalpa
On 7 January 2019, Escalante returned to Honduras and signed with Juticalpa. That year, he made eleven appearances in the Clausura.

Cavalry FC
On 10 April 2019, Escalante signed with Canadian Premier League side Cavalry FC. That season, he made 22 league appearances, scoring four goals, made six appearances in the Canadian Championship and played in both legs of the Canadian Premier League Finals.

On 12 February 2020, Escalante re-signed with Cavalry for the 2020 season, however he was unable to join the team for the shortened campaign due to the COVID-19 pandemic preventing his entry into Canada. On 9 September 2020, Escalante was loaned to Honduran side Vida. In November 2020, Escalante would re-sign with the club for the 2021 season, his third season with the club. In January 2022, Cavalry announced that they had re-signed Escalante for the 2022 and 2023 seasons, with an option for 2024.

International career
Escalante first played for the Honduran U-17 team at the 2011 CONCACAF U-17 Championship, making five appearances in the tournament, including three starts.

Escalante first played for the Honduran U-20 team at the 2013 Central American Games. The following year, he was called up for the 2014 Central American and Caribbean Games, an U-21 tournament. He subsequently received another call-up for the 2015 CONCACAF U-20 Championship, where he made three appearances and helped Honduras qualify for the 2015 FIFA U-20 World Cup. At the U-20 World Cup, Escalante started in all three games for Honduras.

Career statistics

Honours

Club
Calvary FC 
 Canadian Premier League Finals 
Runners-up: 2019
Canadian Premier League (Regular season): 
Champions: Spring 2019, Fall 2019

References

External links

1995 births
Living people
Association football midfielders
Honduran footballers
Sportspeople from Tegucigalpa
Honduran expatriate footballers
Expatriate soccer players in the United States
Honduran expatriate sportspeople in the United States
Expatriate soccer players in Canada
Honduran expatriate sportspeople in Canada
C.D. Olimpia players
C.D. Honduras Progreso players
Rio Grande Valley FC Toros players
Houston Dynamo FC players
Juticalpa F.C. players
Cavalry FC players
C.D.S. Vida players
Liga Nacional de Fútbol Profesional de Honduras players
USL Championship players
Major League Soccer players
Canadian Premier League players
Competitors at the 2014 Central American and Caribbean Games
2015 CONCACAF U-20 Championship players
Central American Games gold medalists for Honduras
Central American Games medalists in football